P. A. Inamdar is an Indian educationist.

Early life and education
Inamdar was born on 28 December 1945. He completed his BA (Honors) in Arts from Shivaji University, Kolhapur.
P.A Inamdar was appointed by Government of India on the Planning Commission's working group on higher education for the twelfth five-year plan period 2012–2017. 
He worked to improve education of minorities in India.

Present positions 
Member, National Council for Promotion of Urdu Language, GOI, New Delhi
Member, Management Council, Hamdard University, New Delhi, A Govt. of India Trust
Member, Management Council, Aligarh Muslim University
Member, Managing Committee, Ce-Cap Education Trust
Member court (Senate) Jamia Milia Islamia Central University New Delhi
Ex.Member, Pharmacy Council of India
Member, Planning Commission of India on Higher Education New
Director, College of Visual Effects, Design and Art, Pune Delhi

Founder
INAMDAR MULTISPECIALITY HOSPITAL: A multi-speciality hospital that is centrally located in Pune
DR. P. A. INAMDAR UNIVERSITY, PUNE

Cases
Inamdar has been involved in a number of cases.
P. A. Inamdar and others Vs State of Maharashtra pune and others 
The Inamdar Judgement: Text of the Supreme Court judgement delivered on 12 August 2005 abolishing state quotas in private unaided professional colleges.
Supreme Court on Mohammad Salim's right to grow beard 
Illegal Floors in Inamdar hospital
Drowning of students of Inamdar College Pune
Jail for assault

References

1945 births
Living people
People from Pune
20th-century Indian educational theorists